Each year the Tennessee Mr. Basketball award is given to the person chosen as the best high school boys' basketball player in the U.S. state of Tennessee by the Tennessee Secondary School Athletic Association.  A Mr. Basketball is named for each of five divisions competing in Tennessee boys' basketball.

Award winners

See also
Tennessee Miss Basketball

References

High school sports in Tennessee
Mr. and Miss Basketball awards
Awards established in 1986
Lists of people from Tennessee
Mr. Basketball